Michel Plays Petrucciani is a jazz album by Michel Petrucciani, Blue Note catalogue number CDP 7 48679 2.

The album was recorded during two sets of sessions, with tracks 1-5 recorded on 24 September 1987 with Gary Peacock and Roy Haynes, and the remaining tracks over 9 and 10 December of the same year with Eddie Gómez and Al Foster.

Personnel
Michel Petrucciani - Piano
Gary Peacock - Bass, tracks 1-5
Roy Haynes - Drums, tracks 1-5
Eddie Gómez - Bass, tracks 6-9
Al Foster - Drums, tracks 6-9

with

John Abercrombie - Guitar, tracks 2 and 7
Steve Thornton - Percussion, track 9

Track listing
All tracks composed by Michel Petrucciani
 "She Did It Again" - 4:03
 "One For Us" - 5:09
 "Sahara" - 4:14
 "13th" - 4:05
 "Mr. K.J." - 4:19
 "One Night At Ken And Jessica's" - 3:08
 "It's A Dance" - 6:16
 "La Champagne" - 6:14
 "Brazilian Suite" - 6:24

References

1988 albums
Michel Petrucciani albums
Blue Note Records albums